Castillo-Albaráñez is a municipality in Cuenca, Castile-La Mancha, Spain. It has a population of 28.

References 

Municipalities in the Province of Cuenca